Black Code is a Canadian documentary film, directed by Nicholas de Pencier and released in 2016. Based on Ronald Deibert's book Black Code: Surveillance, Privacy, and the Dark Side of the Internet, the film explores the ways in which contemporary technology has facilitated an increasingly sophisticated surveillance infrastructure.

The film premiered at the 2016 Toronto International Film Festival.

The film received a Canadian Screen Award nomination for Best Editing in a Documentary (Eric Pedicelli) at the 6th Canadian Screen Awards in 2017.

References

External links
 
 Black Code at Library and Archives Canada

2016 films
2016 documentary films
Canadian documentary films
Films directed by Nicholas de Pencier
2010s English-language films
2010s Canadian films